Ann J. Cahill is an American philosopher and professor of philosophy at Elon University. Her research focuses on feminist philosophy, phenomenology and philosophy of the body.  Her work has developed the concept of “unjust sex," referring not only to sexual assault but also to situations where women are uncomfortably pressured to have sex, or to have sex without contraception. She has also argued that sexual assault survivors should be allowed the right to "the freedom of silence," as talking about one's experiences of assault can aggravate their pain. Cahill holds a PhD in Philosophy from  the State University of New York at Stony Brook.

Bibliography
 Rethinking Rape (2001, Cornell University Press)
 Overcoming Objectification: A Carnal Ethics (2011, Routledge)

References

External links 

 Elon University Profile

American non-fiction writers
Living people
Elon University faculty
Year of birth missing (living people)
Feminist philosophers
20th-century American philosophers
American feminist writers
21st-century American philosophers